HMS Coureuse was a schooner launched in about 1785 at New York, that the French Navy acquired at Cayenne and armed and commissioned at Lorient in 1794. The British captured her in 1795 and the Royal Navy briefly used her as a dispatch vessel in the Mediterranean. The Admiralty sold her in 1799.

Origins
The French Revolution had a positive effect on the design and construction of schooners. Coureuse provides one of the few remaining early draughts, which was taken off at Plymouth dockyard in June 1795.

The British prize court stated that she had been built in New York in 1785, and that as far as it was aware, had always borne the name Coureuse. She was built to pilot boat lines, though she may or may not have been built as a pilot boat.

French service
Coureuse sailed out to Cayenne, and back to Lorient under the command of Lieutenant de Vaisseau Malvin (acting).

Pomone captured all six vessels. At the time of her capture her captors described Curieuse (name latter corrected to Coureuse) as a schooner belonging to the National Convention government and carrying eight brass guns.

The British latter scuttled two of the brigs of little value that they had captured from the convoy, but took the other four vessels as prizes, with Coureuse being taken into service.

British service
The Royal Navy fitted Coureuse out between June and July 1795, and registered her on 22 July. She then briefly served as a dispatch vessel in the Mediterranean.

Fate
Coureuse was offered for sale at Plymouth in March 1799. She was sold on 13 April for £125 to Mr. Dodds.

Notes

Citations

References
 
 
 Fonds Marine. Campagnes (opérations ; divisions et stations navales ; missions diverses). Inventaire de la sous-série Marine BB4. Tome premier : BB4 1 à 209 (1790-1804) 
 
 
 

Schooners of the Royal Navy
Captured ships
1780s ships
Schooners of the French Navy